Shinji (Sinji), or Yungo, is a Bantu language of the Democratic Republic of the Congo, between Mbangala and Yaka.

According to Multitree, the spellings are Şinji (Shinji) and Nuŋgo, rather than Yungo as in Maho (2009), and mentions of the language in the literature are almost entirely in reference to Guthrie.

References

Yaka languages
Languages of the Democratic Republic of the Congo